The emerald snake (Hapsidophrys smaragdinus) is a species of snake of the family Colubridae.

Geographic range
The snake is found in Africa.

References 

Reptiles described in 1837
Reptiles of Africa